Vinska Gorica is a settlement in the Municipality of Dobrna in Slovenia. It lies on a small hill just southeast of Dobrna. The area is part of the traditional region of Styria. The municipality is now included in the Savinja Statistical Region.

Name
The name of the settlement was changed from Gorica to Vinska Gorica in 1953.

References

External links
Vinska Gorica on Geopedia

Populated places in the Municipality of Dobrna